Achterwehr is a municipality, located in the district of Rendsburg-Eckernförde in the German Bundesland of Schleswig-Holstein.

Achterwehr is situated 12 km west of Kiel and about 5 km south of the Kiel Canal. The Autobahn 210 from Kiel to Rendsburg passes to the north of Achterwehr, and the river Eider crosses it.

Achterwehr is the seat of the Amt ("collective municipality") Achterwehr.

References

Rendsburg-Eckernförde